Manticore is an American Sci-Fi original movie that aired on the Sci-Fi Channel on November 26, 2005. It was directed by Tripp Reed and featured Heather Donahue, Chase Masterson and Robert Beltran. It is about a squad of United States Army soldiers in Iraq that must fight against a resurrected, nearly unstoppable manticore awoken from its slumber by an Iraqi insurgent leader.

Overview
United States Army soldiers with the 10th Mountain Division stationed in Iraq are sent on a search to look for missing journalists. They come to a small Iraqi town and find a man-eating monster instead. The soldiers find out that the residents of the town are dead and discover a living "Weapon of Mass Destruction", a Manticore. The Manticore was awakened from its long slumber by an Iraqi insurgent leader wanting to rid the country of foreign occupation forces at any price. The Manticore goes on a killing rampage and soon, the only ones left are Baxter, Keats, and Ashley Pierce. The Manticore kills Ashley by spitting acid on her face before eating her alive, but Baxter and Keats manage to kill it with a camcorder and a sledgehammer.

Cast
 Robert Beltran as Sergeant Tony Baxter
 Heather Donahue as Corporal Keats
 Chase Masterson as Ashley Pierce
 Jeff Fahey as Major Spence Kramer
 Faran Tahir as Umari
 A. J. Buckley as Private Sulley
 Michael Cory Davis as Private Davis
 Benjamin Burdick as Ryan
 Richard Gnolfo as John Busey
 Edmund Druilhet as Sergeant Cohen
 Michail Elenov as Fathi
 George Zlatarev as Safa
 Jeff M. Lewis as Ortiz
 Tripp Reed as Sergeant Henderson
 Vlado Mihailov as Mickey
 Jonas Talkington as "Mouth"
 Atanas Srebrev as "Charms"

References

External links
 
 
 Official website (Dead link as of 31 January 2012)

2005 television films
2005 science fiction action films
2005 horror films
2000s war films
2000s science fiction horror films
American science fiction action films
American science fiction horror films
Arabic-language films
Giant monster films
Horror war films
Supernatural war films
Syfy original films
Iraq War films
2005 films
Films shot in Bulgaria
American horror television films
2000s English-language films
Films directed by Tripp Reed
2000s American films